Hermitage Country Club is a country club located in eastern Goochland County, in the Richmond, Virginia area. The club was organized on October 24, 1900, as "Hermitage Golf Club" by Berkeley Williams and a number of other Richmond businessmen, making it the 4th oldest country club in Virginia. In July 1916, the group was incorporated as "Hermitage Country Club" after its application was approved by the State Corporation Commission. The club hosted the PGA Championship in 1949, at the course that later became Henrico County's Belmont Golf Course.  Sam Snead won his second PGA Championship that year with a 3&2 victory over Johnny Palmer in the final match. The club remains the only club from Virginia to have hosted a major championship. Hermitage has a large pool, 4 indoor & 8 outdoor tennis courts, 36 holes of golf - 2 courses (Manakin 18 & Sabot 18) full gym and weight room, and two dining rooms.

References

External links
 

1900 establishments in Virginia
Athletics clubs in the United States
Buildings and structures in Goochland County, Virginia
Golf clubs and courses in Virginia
Organizations based in Richmond, Virginia
Sports venues completed in 1973
Sports venues in Richmond, Virginia